Commander, U.S. Marine Corps Forces Command (COMMARFORCOM), headquartered at the Naval Support Activity Hampton Roads in Norfolk, Virginia, commands service retained-operating forces; executes force sourcing and synchronization to affect force generation actions in the provisioning of joint capable Marine Corps forces, and directs deployment planning and execution of service retained-operating forces in support of Combatant Commander (CCDR) and service requirements; serves as Commanding General, Fleet Marine Forces Atlantic (CG FMFLANT) and commands embarked Marine Corps forces; coordinates Marine Corps-Navy integration of operational initiatives and advises CDR U.S. Fleet Forces Command (USFF) on support to Marine Corps forces assigned to naval ships, bases, and installations; conducts Service directed operational tasks as required.

As COMMARFORCOM, commands Service retained-operational forces. As CG FMFLANT, commands Service retained-operational forces embarked aboard Naval shipping.
	Status and Command Relationships. MARFORCOM is a Service retained component headquarters with the following command relationships.
	COMMARFORCOM reports to the Commandant of the Marine Corps (CMC).
	COMMARFORCOM commands and exercises administrative control (ADCON) of the following subordinate commands:
	II Marine Expeditionary Force (II MEF)
     Headquarters and Service Battalion, U.S. Marine Corps Forces Command (HQSVCBN)
	Marine Corps Security Cooperation Group (MCSCG)
     Marine Corps Security Force Regiment (MCSFR)
     Chemical Biological Incident Response Force (CBIRF)
 Marine Corps Information Command (MARCOR INFOCOM).  The Commander of Marine Corps Forces Cyberspace Command serves as the Commanding General (CG) of MARCOR INFOCOM.

List of commanders

See also

U.S. Armed Forces operations commands
United States Army Forces Command
United States Fleet Forces Command
Air Combat Command
Space Operations Command

References
This article incorporates text in the public domain from the United States Marine Corps.

Commands of the United States Marine Corps